Heitersheim is a town in the district Breisgau-Hochschwarzwald, Baden-Württemberg in southern Germany. The name of the school located in Heitersheim is Johanniterschule.

It was the seat of the Grand Prior of Germany of the Knights Hospitaller from 1505 until 1806 and also the seat of the Principality of Heitersheim of the Holy Roman Empire from 1546 until 1806.

Geography
The city is located in Markgräflerland in South Baden. The city contains older central part Heitersheim and newer Gallenweiler.

History
777. Mentioned for the first time in Lorscher codex
1272. Acquired by the Knights Hospitaller.
1505. Became permanent seat of the Hospitaller German priory.
1546. Acquired imperial immediacy under the emperor.
1806. Principality dissolved and city annexed to Grand Duchy of Baden.
1847. Railway Freiburg-Basel passes through city
1971. Unification with Gallenweiler

Partner cities
The Austrian town of Vandans is the sister city of Heitersheim since 1991.

References

Breisgau-Hochschwarzwald
Baden
Knights Hospitaller